Mike Simeonoff is a former football (soccer) player who represented New Zealand at international level.

Simeonoff played four official full internationals for New Zealand, making his debut in a 0–2 loss to South Korea on 23 September 1976. He gained his final cap in a 0–1 loss to United Arab Emirates on 10 September 1981.

References 

Year of birth missing (living people)
Living people
Wellington United players
New Zealand association footballers
New Zealand international footballers
Association football midfielders